Brigitte Rougeron (born 14 June 1961 in Paris) is a retired French high jumper.

She finished fifth at the 1985 European Indoor Championships. She became French champion in 1981 and 1986.

Her personal best jump was 1.92 metres, achieved in May 1984 in Haguenau.

Her coach was Marc Schott.

Prize List 

Performances
  Champion of France in the High Jump en 1981 et 1986
 Participation in the 1984 Olympic Games at Los Angeles
 13 International Selections

References

External links
 Results of European Indoor Championship 1985
 Site of la Fédération Française d'Athlètisme - The 10 best french athletes of all time
 Site of la Fédération Française d'Athlètisme - The 100 best french athletes of the Century
 Site of la Fédération Française d'Athlètisme - The best performances of french athletes at European Indoor Championships
 

1961 births
Living people
French female high jumpers
Athletes (track and field) at the 1984 Summer Olympics
Olympic athletes of France
Athletes from Paris